Lyulin (pronounced ) is the largest residential complex both in the capital of Bulgaria - Sofia and in the whole country. It is located in the western outskirts of city and is divided into 10 microdistricts. The complex has a population of 114,813 and is at the disposal of all means of public transport.

Lyulin is a relatively new district. The infrastructural work on the complex began in 1971 and the first condominium was constructed in 1973. The complex is named after the nearby Lyulin Mountain. It is a popular place to live, as transportation is favourable and the real estate is somewhat inexpensive.

Transportation
There are several bus and tram lines (8), two Trolleybus lines (6 and 7), and Sofia Metro (Lyulin, Slivnitsa, and Zapaden park). Three main boulevards - "Tsaritsa Yoanna", "Pancho Vladigerov" and "Slivnitsa" transect the district. The bus, tram, and the trolleys go only to the center. The subway has limited overall coverage, but it is very effective for going to the downtown area and the Mladost district, the latter being in the opposite end of the city.

Education & Health
There are 9 high schools, one elementary school, and a number of private educational centers, the latter usually studying foreign languages, mathematics, and Bulgarian language and literature.  Most schools have indoor swimming pools. There are 2 state polyclinics — 12th in Lyulin 9 and 26th in Lyulin 2 — and "Mediva Center" in Lyulin 4, which is private.

Recreation & entertainment
In the outskirts of the district, towards the downtown lays the second largest park in Sofia, West Park; it is in somewhat dilapidated condition (most of the alleys are dirt tracks, there is no park ranger or any lamp posts whatsoever), but is still extensively used for jogging, cycling (including dirt-biking), outdoor table tennis and, occasionally, the usage of an ATV. There is also "Lyulin Beach" (outdoor swimming pool with various recreational activities) and a couple of small football stadiums.

Commerce
There is one large marketplace with numerous shops, selling various articles and a number of super/hypermarkets (BILLA, Technopolis, Technomarket, METRO, Labyrinth, Praktiker, etc.). Most of these supermarkets are dedicated to one particular trade niche (for example, BILLA is for food and Labyrinth is for furniture)

With the opening of the Mega Mall in September 2014, Lyulin’s entertainment potential has increased significantly.  Regular events such as the TV show “Mini Miss and Mini Mister” are held in the Mall, which also hosts events such as international wine tastings or events celebrating local customs such as Baba Marta.

Crime
Lyulin is commonly associated with crime. There has been a number of major crime-related incidents in the district, such as settlements between members of the organized crime. On one occasion, two police officers were killed in a shootout with suspects. Also, a construction engineering businessman was shot and killed while entering his condo. There is only one police department.

References

Districts of Sofia